International recognition of Kosovo, since its declaration of independence from Serbia enacted on 17 February 2008, has been mixed, and international governments are divided on the issue.

,  out of  United Nations member states, 22 out of 27 European Union member states, 26 out of 30 NATO member states, and 33 out of 57 Organisation of Islamic Cooperation member states have recognised Kosovo. Conflicts have arisen regarding the number of countries recognizing Kosovo. The Government of Serbia does not recognise it as a sovereign state.

In 2013, the two sides began to normalise relations in accordance with the Brussels Agreement. In September 2020, Serbia and Kosovo agreed to normalise economic ties. Serbia also agreed to suspend its efforts to encourage other states to either not recognise Kosovo or to revoke recognition for one year, while Kosovo agreed to not apply for new membership of international organisations for the same period.

Among the G20 countries, eleven (including all seven G7 countries) have recognised Kosovo as an independent state: Australia, Canada, France, Germany, Italy, Japan, Saudi Arabia, South Korea, Turkey, the United Kingdom, and the United States. Eight (including all five BRICS countries), however, have not: Argentina, Brazil, China, India, Indonesia, Mexico, Russia, and South Africa.

Background 

A number of states expressed concern over the unilateral character of Kosovo's declaration, or explicitly announced that they would not recognise an independent Kosovo. The United Nations Security Council (UNSC) remains divided on this issue: of its five members with veto power, three (France, the United Kingdom, and the United States) have recognised the declaration of independence, while the People's Republic of China has expressed concern, urging the continuation of the previous negotiation framework. The Russian Federation has rejected the declaration and considers it illegal. In May 2008, Russia, China, and India released a joint statement calling for new negotiations between Belgrade and Pristina.

Although EU member states individually decide whether to recognise Kosovo, by consensus the EU has commissioned the European Union Rule of Law Mission in Kosovo (EULEX) to ensure peace and continued external oversight. Due to the dispute in the United Nations Security Council (UNSC), the reconfiguration of the United Nations Interim Administration Mission in Kosovo (UNMIK) and partial handover to the EULEX mission met with difficulties. In spite of Russian and Serbian protests, the UN Secretary-General Ban Ki-moon proceeded with the reconfiguration plan. On 15 July 2008, he stated: "In the light of the fact that the Security Council is unable to provide guidance, I have instructed my Special Representative to move forward with the reconfiguration of UNMIK ... in order to adapt UNMIK to a changed reality." According to the Secretary-General, the "United Nations has maintained a position of strict neutrality on the question of Kosovo's status". On 26 November 2008, the UNSC gave the green light to the deployment of the EULEX mission in Kosovo. The EU mission is to assume police, justice, and customs duties from the UN, while operating under the United Nations Security Council Resolution 1244 (UNSCR 1244) that first placed Kosovo under UN administration in 1999.
 

A United Nations General Assembly (UNGA) resolution adopted on 8 October 2008 backed the request of Serbia to seek an International Court of Justice advisory opinion on Kosovo's declaration of independence. On 22 July 2010, the ICJ ruled that the declaration of independence of Kosovo did not violate international law "because international law contains no prohibition on declarations of independence", and that its authors were not bound by the Constitutional Framework (promulgated by UNMIK) or by UNSCR 1244, that is addressed only to United Nations Member States and organs of the United Nations.

Within the EU, key supporters of Kosovo's statehood include France and Germany. The strongest opponents to Kosovo's statehood within the EU include Spain and Greece. The Spanish non-recognition of Kosovo is linked to the Spanish government's opposition to the Basque and Catalan independence movements, while the Greek non-recognition of Kosovo is linked to the Cyprus dispute and Greece's historic relationship to Serbia.

Serbia's reaction 

Due to Serbian claims that Kosovo is part of its sovereign territory, its initial reactions included recalling ambassadors from countries that recognised Kosovo for several months, indicting Kosovar leaders on charges of high treason, and litigating the case at the International Court of Justice (ICJ). Serbia also expelled ambassadors from countries that recognised Kosovo after the UNGA vote adopting Serbia's initiative to seek an ICJ advisory opinion.

In December 2012, as a result of European Union mediated negotiations on Kosovo's status, Serbian Prime Minister Ivica Dačić agreed to appoint a liaison officer to Kosovo. In March 2013, Dačić said that while his government would never recognise Kosovo's independence, "the Serbian president cannot go to Kosovo, nor the prime minister, nor ministers, nor the police or army. Serbs can only leave Kosovo. That's how much Kosovo is ours and what our constitution and laws mean there".

In April 2013, Kosovo and Serbia reached an agreement to normalise relations, and thereby allow both nations to eventually join the European Union. On 17 June 2013 Kosovo and Serbia exchanged liaison officers.

However, the process of normalisation stalled in November 2018, after which Kosovo imposed a 100 percent tax on importing Serbian goods. On 1 April 2020, Kosovo withdrew the tax.

In September 2020, under an agreement brokered by the United States, Serbia and Kosovo agreed to normalise economic ties. Serbia also agreed to suspend its efforts to encourage other states to either not recognise Kosovo or to revoke recognition for one year, while Kosovo agreed to not apply for new membership of international organisations for the same period.

In February 2023, Serbia and Kosovo agreed to a proposed normalisation agreement in European Union mediated dialogue and through further negotiations accepted a roadmap and timescale for its implementation the following month.

International Court of Justice recognition

On 27 March 2008, Serbian Foreign Minister Vuk Jeremić said Serbia would request the International Court of Justice to review the legality of Kosovo's declaration of independence. On 8 October 2008, the UN General Assembly adopted Serbia's resolution requesting the International Court of Justice to assess the legality of Kosovo's declaration of independence. The United Nations General Assembly adopted this proposal on 8 October 2008 with 77 votes in favor, 6 votes against and 74 abstentions. The court delivered its opinion on 22 July 2010; by a vote of 10 to 4, it declared that "the adoption of the declaration of independence of 17 February 2008 did not violate general international law because international law contains no 'prohibition on declarations of independence', nor did the adoption of the declaration of independence violate UN Security Council Resolution 1244, since this did not describe Kosovo's final status, nor had the Security Council reserved for itself the decision on final status.

Positions taken by UN member states and other entities 
According to a 2020 study, states which have stronger ties to the United States are more likely to recognise Kosovo, whereas states with stronger ties to Russia are less likely to recognise Kosovo.

Countries which recognise Kosovo as an independent state

Member states of the United Nations 

Notes

Other states and entities

Alleged withdrawal of recognitions 
Thirteen countries have recognised Kosovo at some point but later allegedly withdrew their recognition according to Serbian media and in some cases, foreign media reports. These are: 

The Serbian Foreign Ministry claimed in March 2020 that a total of eighteen countries had withdrawn their recognition: Burundi, the Central African Republic, the Comoros, Dominica, Ghana, Grenada, Guinea-Bissau, Lesotho, Liberia, Madagascar, Nauru, Palau, Papua New Guinea, São Tomé and Príncipe, Sierra Leone, Solomon Islands, Suriname, and Togo. In some of those cases, Kosovo's foreign ministry has called it "fake news" and "Serbian propaganda". 

Several of these withdrawals have been disputed:

 Ghana recognised the independence of the Republic of Kosovo in 2012. Media reports in 2019 claimed that Ghana had withdrawn recognition of Kosovo. However the 2022 Kosovo Diplomatic List states that the Ghanaian embassy in Ankara, Turkey is accredited to the Republic of Kosovo with the Ghanaian ambassador in Ankara being described as "Ambassador Extraordinary and Plenipotentiary - Non resident in Pristina". The official website of the Kosovo foreign ministry lists Ghana as one of the countries that recognise the independence of Kosovo.

 The Union of the Comoros recognised the independence of Kosovo in May 2009. In November 2018 it was reported by Russian and Serbian sources that Comoros had withdrawn recognition of Kosovo following a meeting between its foreign minister and Russian foreign minister Sergey Lavrov. In February 2021, former President of Kosovo Behgjet Pacolli released a note verbale from the foreign ministry of Comoros stating that Comoros continues to recognise the independence of Kosovo. The official website of the Kosovo foreign ministry lists Comoros as one of the countries that recognise the independence of Kosovo.

 Sierra Leone recognised the independence of Kosovo in 2008. In March 2020, Serbian media sources claimed that Sierra Leone had withdrawn recognition. However in November 2022, the Ambassador of Kosovo in the United Arab Emirates hosted his Sierra Leone counterpart and stated that Sierra Leone was one of the first countries to have recognised the independence of Kosovo. The foreign ministry of Kosovo lists Sierra Leone as one of the countries that have formally recognised the independence of Kosovo.

 Guinea-Bissau withdrew recognition in November 2017, but in 2018 sent a note verbale to the government of Kosovo stating that the previous note revoking recognition had no effect. Relations between the two countries were again confirmed in January 2023.

 Just a few days after reports emerged of its withdrawal of recognition in June 2018, the government of Liberia issued a statement "reaffirming bilateral relations with Kosovo" and stating that such reports were false.

 Suriname recognized the independence of Kosovo on July 8, 2016. On 27 October 2017, the Serbian Foreign Minister at the time, Ivica Dačić, claimed that the recognition was withdrawn on October 27, 2017. Kosovo's Ministry of Foreign Affairs denied having received a verbal note on de-recognition and stated that Kosovo and Suriname maintained friendly relations. On June 10, 2022, Kosovo's Foreign Minister Donika Gërvalla-Schwarz met with her Surinamese counterpart Albert Ramdin, where they talked about enhancing the cooperation between the two countries.

 On January 21, 2019, the Serbian Foreign Ministry claimed that Palau had withdrawn its recognition of Kosovo. However, on September 23, 2022, the President of Kosovo, Vjosa Osmani, met with Palau's Foreign Minister Gustav Aitaro and both sides reconfirmed their bilateral relations and multilateral cooperation. In October 2022, Palau's Vice-President Uduch Sengebau Senior made an official visit to Kosovo, where she met with President Osmani, and the sides confirmed their willingness to further deepen their bilateral relations.

 There were conflicting reports on whether Oman has recognised Kosovo, or de-recognised it. In February 2011, Kosovo announced that it received a note from Oman which stated that it "will welcome Kosovo's membership to the United Nations, as well as to other international and regional organizations" and that the countries had established diplomatic relations. However, in September 2011 Kosovo's deputy Foreign Minister Petrit Selimi stated that "Oman never recognised us". Later that month, Kosovo's Ministry of Foreign Affairs announced that Oman's Foreign Minister Yusuf bin Alawi bin Abdullah had informed them of his country's recognition of Kosovo. Kosovo's chargé d'affaires in Saudi Arabia was quoted in 2012 as saying that Oman had not recognised Kosovo. In September 2022, the foreign ministry of Oman officially issued a press release explicitly stating that the Omani foreign minister had met with the president and foreign minister of the "Republic of Kosovo", implying that Oman does indeed recognise the Republic of Kosovo as an independent state. The foreign ministry of Kosovo lists Oman as one of the countries that have formally recognised the independence of Kosovo.

Other recognition withdrawal claims by Serbia 
On 4 January 2023, Serbian president Aleksandar Vučić claimed that nine new countries had withdrawn recognition: Antigua and Barbuda, Burkina Faso, Eswatini, Gabon, Guinea, Libya, Maldives, Saint Lucia, and Somalia. Kosovo's foreign ministry said they had no notification of any recognition withdrawals claimed by Vučić. Following the claims, Kosovo diplomats met with diplomats from Eswatini, Gabon, Libya, the Maldives, Somalia and Antigua and Barbuda and stated that those countries had not derecognised Kosovo, contradicting Vučić's claims.

Countries which have not recognised Kosovo as an independent state 
Diplomatic recognition is an explicit, official, unilateral act in the foreign policy of states in regards to another party. Not having issued such a statement does not necessarily mean the state has objections to the existence, independence, sovereignty or government of the other party. Some states, by custom or policy, do not extend formal recognitions, on the grounds that a vote for membership in the UN or another organisation whose membership is limited to states is itself an act of recognition.

Member states of the United Nations

A

B

C

E

G

I

J

K

L

M

N

P

R

S

T

U

V

Z

Other states and entities

Positions taken by intergovernmental organisations 

Intergovernmental organisations do not themselves diplomatically recognise any state; their member states do so individually. However, depending on the intergovernmental organisation's rules of internal governance and the positions of their member states, they may express positive or negative opinions as to declarations of independence, or choose to offer or withhold membership to a partially recognised state.

Positions taken by other actors

Autonomous regions and secessionist movements

International non-governmental organisations

See also 
 Foreign relations of Kosovo
 List of diplomatic missions in Kosovo
 List of diplomatic missions of Kosovo
 Membership of Kosovo in international organisations
 Membership of Kosovo in international sports federations
 Advisory opinion on Kosovo's declaration of independence
 Reactions to the International Court of Justice advisory opinion on Kosovo's declaration of independence
 Kosovo–Serbia relations
 Belgrade–Pristina negotiations
 List of states with limited recognition

Notes

References

Further reading 
 Ioannis Armakolas and James Ker-Lindsay. 2019. The Politics of Recognition and Engagement: EU Member State Relations with Kosovo. Springer.
 Gëzim Visoka. 2018. Acting Like a State: Kosovo and the Everyday Making of Statehood. Routledge.

Independence of Kosovo
Politics of Kosovo
Kosovo
2000s in Kosovo
2010s in Kosovo
 

fr:Kosovo#Reconnaissance internationale